North Yarmouth Academy (also known as "NYA") is an independent, co-ed, college preparatory day school serving students from early childhood education to postgraduate. NYA was founded in 1814, in what was then North Yarmouth, Maine, prior to the 1849 secession that established Yarmouth, the town in which the school now stands. NYA has 375 enrolled students with an average class size of 14 students. NYA offers 16 interscholastic sports for boys and girls at the Varsity and Junior Varsity level.

Program
NYA students carry five academic courses plus electives each year and are required to participate in athletics or theater each season/semester. NYA offers 16 Advanced Placement courses. Beginning in the 2012-13 academic year, NYA offers Mandarin Chinese as part of its Modern and Classical Languages Department.

NYA student athletes participate on a variety of varsity athletic teams. All NYA students in grades 6-12 participate in team sports or approved alternatives three seasons per year. More than 40% of graduates continue to play intercollegiate sports. One hundred percent of Middle School students and 73% of Upper School students participate in a musical ensemble. There are currently 12 musical ensembles offered at NYA.

During the 2010-2011 school year, NYA students gave more than 4,500 hours to community service, assisting more than 55 community and civic organizations in the Greater Portland, Maine area.

From 2001 to 2011, NYA built a $3M science center (the Peter W. Mertz Science Center, 2006), has renovated the oldest building on campus (Russell Hall, 2009) into a foreign language center, added an all-weather athletic (turf) field, built the Priscilla Savage Middle School in 2003 and increased endowment for faculty enrichment and student diversity.

NYA added a Lower School, grades Pre-K through 4, in the fall of 2013 and expanded to include a toddler program (18-months) in the fall of 2014. The Lower School uses Montessori methods through kindergarten. In the first through fourth grades, the program builds off a Montessori foundation, fostering curiosity and motivation to learn while also preparing students for an easy transition to the Middle School at NYA.

Facilities 

The NYA campus consists of academic and art buildings and two athletic buildings. The campus also has two athletic fields, three tennis courts, and a softball field.  Its two oldest surviving buildings, Russell Hall (1841) and Academy Hall (1847), are listed on the National Register of Historic Places.

Priscilla Savage Middle School - Grades 5-8, health services office, and community room
Peter W. Mertz Science Building - Science, and some math, classes for both the Middle and Upper Schools
Higgins Hall - The choral and instrumental music building, also includes functionality for a black box theater and recording studio/practice rooms
Russell Hall - Current foreign language center, Edgar F. White '38 Athletic Hall of Fame, and former science building
Academy Hall - Former 7th and 8th grade building, currently empty
Blanchard House - Middle School art
Dole House - Office building, including admission, alumni relations, development, and marketing & communications offices
Curtis Complex - Main building for Upper School students, includes Bicentennial Learning Commons, gymnasium, and Safford Center (cafeteria and stage), main office, and business office
Toddler House, Storer House -  Two classrooms for our youngest students ages 18 months to 3 years old. Former 6th grade building, auction volunteer office, retail store, communications and summer programs office
Merrill Lower School Building - Main building for Lower School students with primary to grade 4 classrooms. Renovated 23 Storer Street in 2013 and expanded in 2014

Two former NYA properties, the Weld House and Shepley House, were sold in 2018 to private investors for development into a condominium complex. The Payne Elwell House, at 162 Main Street, is also under contract to be sold.

Athletics 
North Yarmouth Academy has an athletic requirement that each student in grades 6 through 12 participate in an athletic program every season throughout the school year. Exceptions to this policy include the ability to participate in the arts once a year.

Sports
NYA offers 16 interscholastic sports for both Boys and Girls, each at the Varsity and Junior Varsity level.

Facilities

Gymnasium 
NYA's gymnasium is located behind, and attached to, the Curtis Complex. The gym includes the athletic director's office, two locker rooms, and the Hall of Awards. The gym is used for men's and women's basketball, women's volleyball, and for large assemblies, including all school gatherings, and senior speeches.

Fields 
In 2006, NYA completed transforming Lewis Field from grass to turf. NYA currently has two athletic fields, one turf and one grass (Denney Field). Since its completion, Varsity and Junior Varsity Lacrosse, Soccer, and Field Hockey play all their home games on Lewis. NYA uses Knight Field for its Softball program.

Travis Roy Ice Arena 
The North Yarmouth Academy Ice Arena was built in 1975. In 1998 it was remodeled and renamed to the Travis Roy Ice Arena in honor of Travis Roy. It contains a fitness room, heated viewing area, locker rooms, and a pro shop. It is home to the NYA Boys and Girls Ice Hockey teams as well as the Yarmouth High School ice hockey teams. The facility is also used by Casco Bay Hockey and Midcoast Youth Hockey for their ice hockey programs.

The Poulin Family Tennis Courts 
North Yarmouth Academy has three tennis courts plus a practice backboard which were reconstructed and renamed as The Poulin Family Tennis Courts in 2019.

Rivalries 
NYA maintains two local athletic rivalries. The first is with hometown rival Yarmouth High School, and the second is with Waynflete School in Portland.

Notable alumni 

 John C. Hall, physician, Wisconsin state senator and Union Army doctor
 Leonard Swett, 1843, close friend of President Abraham Lincoln, organizer of the 1860 Republican National Convention in Chicago
 Charles Addison Boutelle, 1851, 9-term U.S. congressman (1880–1901)
 Augustus W. Corliss, 1851, writer and historian
 Harlan Prince, sea captain
 Oliver O. Howard, Union general during the Civil War and founder of Howard University
 John Albion Andrew, Governor of Massachusetts 1861–1865
 George Frederick Barker, physician and scientist
 Augustus Burbank, physician, former president of NYA
 Thomas Young Crowell, founder of publishing house Thomas Y. Crowell & Co. (1876–1976), later bought out by Harper & Row
 Frank Knight, 1925, arborist, for whom Knight Field is named
 Ernie Coombs C.M., 1945, one of Canada's most famous and popular TV personalities, 'Mr. Dressup' Order of Canada recipient 
 Eric Weinrich, 1985, former NHL defenceman
 Eric Fenton, 1988 professional ice hockey player
 Travis Roy, 1995, ice hockey player. After his career ending injury he founded the Travis Roy Foundation and was a highly successful motivational speaker'
 Oliver Wahlstrom, professional hockey player for the New York Islanders

See also
National Register of Historic Places listings in Cumberland County, Maine

References

External links

Private high schools in Maine
School buildings on the National Register of Historic Places in Maine
Private elementary schools in Maine
Private middle schools in Maine
Preparatory schools in Maine
National Register of Historic Places in Cumberland County, Maine